Vista, previously known as The Royal Leicestershire, Rutland and Wycliffe Society for the Blind, is an English independent charity. It provides services for blind and partially sighted people of Leicester, Leicestershire and Rutland. After many years of operations, it took its current name in 2002.

References

External links 

Charities based in Leicestershire
Charities based in Rutland
1858 establishments in England